The 2nd Battalion of Special Assignment "Donbas" is a unit of the National Guard of Ukraine subordinated to the Ministry of Internal Affairs of Ukraine and based in Severodonetsk. Originally created in 2014 as a volunteer unit called the Donbas Battalion by Semen Semenchenko following the Russian occupation of Crimea and possible invasion of continental Ukraine. The formation of the unit started in the spring of 2014 during the 2014 pro-Russian unrest in Ukraine. The unit was initially formed as an independent force, but has been since fully integrated into the National Guard as the 2nd Special Purpose Battalion "Donbas" within the 15th Regiment of the National Guard.

The Donbas Battalion was initially formed by Russian-speaking Ukrainians from the Donbas who opposed the separatist movement. They are one of the most notable volunteer battalions, recognized as a highly effective combat unit during the War in Donbas, and also by the constant use of balaclavas, not only to hide their identities from pro-Russian sympathizers, but also to create a sense of mystery and fear around them. Their use of balaclavas and occasionally of black fatigues led to them begin nicknamed as the "Men in Black" or "Little Black Men", as a Ukrainian analogue of the Russian "Little Green Men".

In October 2016 a veteran of the former volunteer battalion Anatoliy Vynohrodskyi announced their intent to revive a volunteer battalion outside of the National Guard. The creation of the new volunteer battalion was never realized. Instead, in January 2017, Vynohradskyi became one of the leaders of the trade blockade with the Russian occupied territories in the Ukrainian East.

History

Background 
At the beginning of March 2014, when separatist sentiments started to boil over in Donetsk, the pro-Maidan self-defense forces of the Donetsk Oblast was created by pro-Ukrainian citizens from Donetsk Oblast in order to protect pro-Maidan protests in response to the calls to create a separatist Donetsk People's Republic (DPR) and to prevent violence by the Russian special services and separatists against Ukrainian citizens. Semen Semenchenko was motivated by the weak state of the Ukrainian Armed Forces, as well as the capitulation of many local officials to the separatists, to found a group of local volunteers to defend the territorial integrity of Ukraine. For example, in February 2014, the Head of the Militsiya (national police) for Donetsk Oblast, Roman Romanov, handed over his powers to pro-Russian separatists, while Pavel Gubarev, the leader of the pro-Russian separatists in the Donbass seized the building of the Donetsk Oblast Administration.

The Donbas self-defense forces asked the leadership of Dnipropetrovsk Oblast and the military commissariat to create a territorial defense battalion and succeeded in this, but only after a similar proposal to the administration of Donetsk Oblast was rejected. On 15 April, a recruitment of volunteers and officers began into a new unit, which was named the Donbas Battalion. Volunteer groups, a charitable foundation of the battalion were created, and Ukrainians from all over the country sent aid and money for the unit's logistical needs. The battalion is based in Dnipropetrovsk Oblast. Citizens with licensed weapons are invited to join.

Non-governmental armed formation (April 2014 – June 2014) 

In March 2014, a self-defense unit of the Donetsk Oblast was created. After the first battles with DPR forces, the creation of the Donbas Volunteer Battalion was announced. The commander of the squad was Semen Semenchenko, who announced a recruitment of volunteers to the unit on his Facebook page.
In a few days, about 600 volunteers signed up to the Donbas battalion, and since the end of April the unit began its activities in the Donetsk Oblast. They provided assistance in moving activists who are in danger and collected information about the coordinators of pro-Russian rallies and checkpoints. The battalion leadership created groups for counteraction, intelligence, warning and escort.

On May 1, the unit participated in its first operation to capture and destroy the civil checkpoints. The Donbas Battalion successfully destroyed a separatist checkpoint in Krasnoarmiysk. Three Kalashnikovs were seized and 15 civilians captured.

The battalion commander was offered to locate a base in Novopidgorodnye at the boundary of the Dnipropetrovsk and Donetsk Oblasts. After the checkpoint in Krasnoarmiysk had been destroyed, the personnel returned to the location. A few hours later, reported Russian mercenaries arrived in three buses to assault the Donbas base. The Donbas fighters were armed with several small-caliber rifles, an old rifle and several grenades. The attempt to assault the checkpoint did not succeed, as a Ukrainian military helicopter flew to help the surrounded volunteer battalion, prompting the attackers to retreat.

 On 11 May, a subdivision of the Donbas Battalion, stationed in Mariupol, was in charge of the protection of the city. The soldiers of the unit assisted the Ukrainian National Guard in the recapture of Mariupol's police station.

On 15 May 2014, the formed unit carried out an operation to clear the Donbass territories from enemy sabotage groups. The operation was held in Velyka Novosilka, during which the DPR flag was torn down from the building of the district administration and the flag of Ukraine was put on and the control over the district was returned to Ukrainian administration. Educational work was carried out with militiamen, who had previously handed over control of the region to DPR forces. The Donbas battalion took the district under military occupation, supervising elections in Velikonovosilkivsky district. With the region under government control, the branches of the largely defunct Party of Regions and the banned Communist Party were forced to dissolve.

On 21 May 2014, Semen Semenchenko, the battalion commander, called the part of the employees of the State Automobile Inspection of Ukraine in the Donetsk region who defected to the DPR side as "traitors" as well as those who were carrying joint service with DPR soldiers at the checkpoints, accompanying vehicle columns and guarding the administrative buildings. He demanded that they hand over their arms and leave the Donetsk Oblast territory within 24 hours, until noon on May 22, threatening to eliminate them if they continued cooperate with the DPR.
As of May 21, the battalion took control over the administration buildings of four districts: Velikonovosilkivsky, Volodarsky, Dobropolsky and Aleksandrivsky. This was a part of the operation to ensure the security of polling stations, which allowed the presidential elections in Ukraine to be held smoothly in 2014.

On 22 May 2014, Semenchenko announced Ukrainian control over the Volodarske district was re-established.

On 23 May, the unit performed an operation to attack fortified areas, but fell into an ambush in Karlivka. Twenty five fighters fought with the enemy, a company of the Vostok battalion. Five Donbas fighters were killed and the Vostok battalion lost 11. According to Semenchenko, the losses of the Donbas battalion were 4 people killed, 1 died from wounds, about 20 wounded, and some number were captured.

Special purpose battalion in the National Guard of Ukraine (June 2014 – October 2016) 

After the battle near Karlivka, for the leadership of the Donbas battalion it became clear that Russian mercenaries in the Donbass had already got not only small arms but heavy weapons as well. Moreover, it became obvious that the Armed Forces leadership did not provide sufficient assistance to Ukrainian volunteer detachments. The Armed Forces units, located 5 km from Karlivka, did not come to help Ukrainian volunteers. In this regard, Semen Semenchenko accepted the proposal of the Minister of Internal Affairs, Arsen Avakov to merge the battalion into the National Guard of Ukraine. This would have offered an opportunity to arm the battalion, should have given it a legal status and provided an opportunity to coordinate its actions with the units of the Armed Forces, the NGU and the Ministry of Internal Affairs.

On 1 June, Semen Semenchenko spoke at the People's Veche (assembly) on Maidan Nezalezhnosti (Independence Square), where he first called on participants to join the unit to protect the territorial integrity of Ukraine. On the first day of the volunteers' recording, about 600 people arrived at Novy Petrovtsy training range, a base of Ukrainian Army Unit 3027. After this, several more volunteer enrollments were held on the Maidan. During one of these enrollments on June 8, 2014, 10 soldiers of the Presidential Regiment appeared to have entered the battalion ranks.

On 3 June, while a decision was being made to send volunteer battalions to the ATO, the Donbas battalion was asked to keep guard near the Verkhovna Rada as the Internal Troops were not able to offer adequate protection. The Donbas fighters faced the building of the Verkhovna Rada turning their backs to the people, demonstrating on which side they were – on the side of people.

On 29 June, Semenchenko, the battalion commander spoke at the People's Veche (assembly) on Maidan Nezalezhnosti (Independence Square), calling for a complete change and reform of all public authorities and state institutions. A mobilization station was announced to be created on Maidan Nezalezhnosti and many volunteers were recorded to have joined. After the Veche (assembly) the Donbas battalion volunteers went to the Presidential Administration. The battalion volunteers headed by Semen Semenchenko demanded to stop a cease-fire order with Russian mercenaries. President Poroshenko assured the future military unit that they would soon have an opportunity to go to the ATO area and fight.
On 19 July, a decision was made to form a special purpose volunteer battalion Crimea, and on 21 July, the commander of the Donbas battalion announced the recruitment of volunteers to a new unit. It was planned to liberate Donbas from Russian mercenaries first, then involve the Krym Battalion in the liberation of the Autonomous Republic of Crimea from the Russian occupation.
On 4 June 2014, in the city of Izium, a meeting of the political, military and police leadership of Ukraine was held to coordinate the actions of the Donbas and Azov volunteer battalions with other military units, attended by Oleksandr Turchynov, Chairman of the Verkhovna Rada of Ukraine, Arseniy Avakov, Minister of Internal Affairs of Ukraine, representatives of law enforcement agencies, as well as commanders of both battalions. At the meeting, samples of modern armored vehicles manufactured by the Malyshev plant were shown, particularly armored combat vehicles Dozor which the Donbas were planned to be supplied to the Battalion. Semenchenko stated that having such armored vehicles he was ready to liberate Donetsk. However, for all subsequent years of the war, the Donbas battalion did not receive any such vehicle.

After the military meeting in Slavyansk it was decided to send a company of the Donbas battalion to the ATO area. However, the unit was provided neither with vehicles, nor with fuel for transportation, nor with adequate equipment. At request of Semen Semenchenko, the unit commander, volunteers, entrepreneurs and ordinary Ukrainians gathered everything necessary and a company of the Donbas battalion managed to go to the frontline.

4 July 2014, an assault company of the Donbas battalion took part in a liberation operation of Mykolayivka, the Donetsk Oblast. Immediately after this operation a retreat of Russian mercenaries from Slavyansk started. The first person who provided intelligence data that the city could be entered in was Yaroslav Markevych, a volunteer of the Donbas battalion who led a group of unmanned aerial vehicles.

The battalion fighters located in Artemivsk took active effort in liberating the city from DPR forces – night-time attacks of militants were being met, checkpoints were being built in and outside the city, and operations were conducted to clear the territory. The battalion units provided patrols of the surrounding areas of Artemivsk and Horlivka.

Only one IFV out of the promised armored vehicles was allocated for the Donbas battalion and the battalion had a KRAZ on the volunteers' balance sheet. Among the other "special equipment" they had two CIT vehicles, which Donbas fighters retook from Russian mercenaries in the first minutes of the battle.
As a result of the operation, the volunteer battalions accused the Ministry of Defense of Ukraine of failing to provide the necessary support in heavy weapons.
On 17 August 2014, together with other units, the Donbas Battalion again participated in the assault of Ilovaysk. The unit entered the city and took positions at the city school number 14 near the railway, fulfilling the task set. However, the adjacent units did not fully fulfill their obligations again.
In the interim report of the Temporary Investigative Commission of the Verkhovna Rada investigating the tragic events under Ilovaysk, it says:

On 19 August 2014, Semen Semenchenko, the commander of the Donbas battalion, was injured during the assault of Ilovaysk, having suffered shrapnel wounds. Within 10 days, fierce battles had not stopped.
On 29 August 2014, leaving Ilovaysk via the Green Corridor, a Ukrainian military group fell into ambush and happened to be under the shell fire of the Russian regular army. During their retreat from the Ilovaysk salient, 98 soldiers of the unit were captured. More than 100 unit fighters were injured. The official estimates were 366 dead, 249 wounded, and 158 missing during fighting for Ilovaysk and leaving the Green Corridor.
During September, October and November, the battalion personnel were withdrawn from the ATO area and engaged in a combat coordination exercise. A part of the fighters were sent to Zolochiv city to undergo NCO training. In September, a large number of volunteers came to the battalion and it deployed to training camp of the 93rd Separate Mechanized brigade in Cherkaske village, Dnipropetrovsk oblast, which had about 300 recruits. At the end of October, the battalion personnel, together with the recruits were relocated to Kyiv oblast for training with instructors and a combat coordination exercise.
During that period, the battalion could not move to the combat area due to the fact that about 100 soldiers of the unit were captured by Russian mercenaries during the withdrawal from the Ilovaisk salient. In case the battalion moved to the front line, the prisoners could have been executed.

On 18 November, the first rotation of the Donbas battalion to the Peace Valley of Luhansk oblast took place. They had to watch at the local support point to assist the Armed Forces of Ukraine. The battalion was engaged in a clearing operation of sabotage reconnaissance groups of Russian army mercenaries and support of 24th separate mechanized brigade on the Bakhmut route..On 15 December the second rotation took place.
From 15 to 25 December 2015, the Donbas Battalion organized a blockade of Akhmetov humanitarian convoys to the Lugansk People's Republic-occupied territories in order to accelerate a captive exchange process, blocking motorways in Luhansk oblast by mobile groups in a tank-dangerous direction. Volunteer divisions, including Dnipro-1, Right Sector and Aidar were involved in fulfilling separate tasks. Supplies of tobacco and vodka by Russian mercenaries were also blocked. The operation was successful – as a result of the blockade after the negotiations on 26 December, 97 soldiers from the Donbas Battalion were released from captivity of pro-Russian mercenaries who had been captured during the operation in Ilovaysk.
On 11 January 2015, the Donbas Battalion marched to Kyiv demanding an immediate sending of the unit into a combat area to carry out missions there. A volunteer column came to the Ministry of Internal Affairs and surrounded the building.

In January 2015, certain ex-fighters who were expelled from the battalion due to misconduct began to accuse Semenchenko of criminal behavior. However, the majority of the personnel didn't believe the accusation.

Nevertheless, on 13 January 2015 two companies of the battalion went to the ATO area. However, the promised armored vehicles that had been given to the battalion before start proved to be unsuitable for military tasks.At that time, the unit was performing tasks under the guidance of the Headquarters of 24th separate mechanized brigade. On 27 January, a battalion company came to the battlefield deployment from an early rotation.
On 31 January, Semen Semenchenko  took part in the operation to relieve the Svityaz battalion and was shell-shocked.
On 1 February, there was an attack in the area of Vuglegirsk. The soldiers were killed; the commander happened to be in an accident.
In January–February 2015, the Donbas battalion took part in battles near Debaltseve as in an attack of fortified areas of Russian mercenaries. Anti-diversion and assault groups were operating there. During fighting for Vuglegirsk on 1 February, the unit lost four fighters. On 9 February, the units of the Armed Forces of Ukraine, in cooperation with an anti-diversion group of the Donbas Battalion, did not allow Russian mercenaries to take control of Debaltsevo-Artemivsk route. On 12 February, the units of the Armed Forces of Ukraine took control of a part of Logvinovo and unblocked the Artemivsk-Debaltsevo highway. The remaining resistance cells were suppressed; the Donbas battalion units carried out a clearing operation of the village and an adjacent section of the highway. In the morning of 13 February, the clearing operation of the Donbas battalion near Logvinovo was stopped. When units of the Armed Forces of Ukraine together with armored vehicles were withdrawn, militants counterattacked using armored troops – 7 tanks; the intensity of fighting was increasing. In the battles for Logvinovo, the Donbas battalion destroyed about a platoon of enemies, a tank and an IFV, though three soldiers perished and four were injured. By midday of 13 February, the Donbas battalion and the Armed Forces had killed about 50 separatist fighters near Logvinovo. Seventeen Russian mercenaries had been captured, who were later transferred to the SSU for exchange. The Donbas battalion and the Armed Forces of Ukraine held "a road of life", parallel to the field track. It was fired upon but the battalion was able to successfully protect the convoys passing through . At some points, the situation was complicated, and fighters had to fight half-trapped by pro-Russian units. The Donbas battalion fighters captured an enemy's multi-purpose light-armored towered vehicle and a 122mm mortar as war trophies.

On 15 February, a Donbas battalion company took part in an operation to destroy fortified areas of Russian mercenaries and entered Shirokino, but it was ambushed by separatist militants because a conductor "missed a turn." In the course of the battle, three battalion soldiers died, three were injured, and one of them died later because of mortal wounds. During the battle of Shirokino, from15–16 February more than 100 troops from the separatist forces were killed and 10 armored vehicles were destroyed by the Donbas, Azov and AFU units.

Late evening on 16 February, the Ukrainian military managed to squeeze armed men who were not identified as soldiers of the Armed Forces of Ukraine out of one of the two heights near Shirokino. Earlier, 14 Donbas Battalion fighters were able to escape from an encirclement made by separatist forces in Shirokino. On 18 February, near Shirokino, having occupied a residential multi-storied building before, separatist supported by mercenaries began shelling Ukrainian positions with two mortars. Two hours later, a separatist armed group was kicked out by Ukrainian troops and began leaving in the direction of Novoazovsk. Another illegal armed group, as a result of actions of Ukrainian troops, went to the north-east – from the eastern outskirts of Shirokino under the cover of two tanks, one of the tanks malfunctioned and was evacuated by the retreating separatists. On that day, a representative of the Ukrainian intelligence reported that Shirokino was under the fire of mortar shells and tanks of separatist armed units; in the evening of 16 February, one soldier in a Donbas battalion platoon was killed and four were wounded. The next night, a battalion column fell into an ambush, and three soldiers were killed. On 7 March, the battalion fighters detected a sabotage-reconnaissance group of the Russian Special Forces. During the battle, three mercenaries were killed and other militants were captured. In order to take them back Russian mercenaries opened fire with tanks. While repulsing the attack a Donbas battalion soldier was killed. On 9 March, a Donbas battalion company supported by a tank of the 37th Battalion and the Armed Forces of Ukraine, was clearing up the sea coast and knocking off the invaders from the coastal positions and occupying a dominant position that blocked access to the battalion's rear. During the operation, 1 fighter was lightly wounded. 15 invaders were destroyed. The Azov's tank was put into a battle, an IFV belonging to DPR was damaged by joint efforts. Another Donbas fighter was shell-shocked.

On 9 April, the barracks of separatist units were destroyed in Shirokino by joint actions of the Azov regiment and the Donbas battalion during the fire response to the Russian mercenary attack.
On 25 April, after bombardment of an ambulance near Shirokino a wounded soldier of the Donbas battalion died on the way to hospital. On 2 May, another attack by pro-Russian separatists was defeated by the Donbas battalion fighters. Three military personnel were wounded. During one battle, at 13:05, a shot from a sniper rifle wounded a Donbas battalion fighter on his head. On 3 May, during the fighting in Shirokino, another soldier from the Donbas battalion was killed. On 24 May, in Shirokino, one soldier of the Donbas battalion was killed and one was wounded. Overnight into 26 May, an anti-tank platoon of the Donbas Battalion destroyed a KamAZ carrying separatist troops and ammunition. A Donbas Battalion soldier was wounded at night, in response, the enemy's fire points were suppressed. On 19 July, in Shirokino near Mariupol the Donbas battalion combatants took an IFV-2 from the Russian mercenaries during the battle. It had a torn caterpillar and beaten optics. The IFV was towed to the positions of the Ukrainian Army.
During May–July 2015, in Mariupol, there were rallies against so-called demilitarization of Mariupol, which would mean a total withdrawal of the military personnel from the first line of defense in Shirokine within Minsk agreements. Demilitarization did not take place, but at the end of July 2015, the Donbas battalion was withdrawn from watching Shirokino's front positions. The Donbas and Azov volunteer battalions, which kicked the invaders out of Shirokino and from February to June 2015 "held" positions, were replaced by Marine Corps of the Armed Forces.
From October 2015 to March 2016, the Donbas battalion was on duty on the checkpoints of the third defense line near Mariupol and Berdyansk.
From March 2016 to April 2016, a significant part of the Donbas battalion was demobilized, serving as the mobilized for a calendar year, being reluctant to continue service on the third defense line. Part of the soldiers remained in the unit hoping that the unit would still fight on the first defense line.
After April 2016, the battalion was on duty on checkpoints in Mariupol zone and protected the Azov Sea coast.
In early August 2016 more than 160 battalion soldiers arrived at the military training ground in the village of Stare, Kyiv oblast (3070 military unit base), for the purpose of an operational coordination. Another company of the battalion remained in Mariupol and was preparing for retirement, as the battalion was taken out of the combat area.
In mid-September, from the training ground in the village of Stare, the personnel was transferred to Slovyansk, Donetsk oblast (3035 military unit base). Part of the soldiers was sent back to the military unit 3057 in Mariupol.
According to an order of the NGU commander on reducing the manpower in the military unit 3057 (end of August 2016) the special-purpose battalion Donbas was destroyed. Personnel were retired due to the organizational and staffing measures on 19 September 2016. On 26 September 2016, the battalion officers were retired.

From October 2016 to present time – a non-governmental voluntary organization aimed at protection of Ukraine

Internal Corps of the Donbas Battalion 

When the majority of personnel of the NGU Donbas battalion was demobilized into the reserve in 2016, together with an honorary commander of the Donbas battalion Semen Semenchenko and the second commander of the Donbas battalion Anatoliy Vinogrodskiy, an Internal Corps of the Donbas Battalion as a public organization was formed, and later as a non-governmental volunteer organization "Donbas volunteer battalion", where the battle flag was brought [115]. The organization consists of demilitarized soldiers of the battalion who participate and conduct community-oriented activities aimed at protecting Ukrainian citizens from the unlawful acts of titushky (bullies), law enforcement agencies and fighting corruption. Starting from July 2016, the battalion Internal Corps took part in actions against illegal construction, against unauthorized felling of green spaces in Kyiv and its suburbs; was engaged in protecting businesses and agricultural businesses from raider take-overs, protecting the population from Titushky, exposing criminal activities of police and cooperation between police and Titushky; provided legal and media support to political prisoners, was engaged in a civil control of court sessions in cases against corruptioners and traitors, anti-maidanivtsi and raiders; blocked railroad goods traffic to occupied territories during the Blockade of Trade with Occupants; it protected a protest camp at Hrushevskyi Street during the "Rally for Political Reform".

On 2 July, during Kyiv Pechersk Court attempt to arrest a chief of staff of the Aydar battalion Valentin Likholit, several hundred veterans of the War for Independence and public figures protested in Khreshchatyk. They repelled Likholit without allowing him to be imprisoned illegally. On the same day, on Maidan Nezalezhnosti (Independence Square), Patriots’ Liberation Headquarters was proclaimed to be established. The main task was to provide legal and moral support to illegally imprisoned and repressed volunteers and patriots. At the meeting, when Patriots' Liberation Headquarters was established, three activity directions were announced: discharge from custody unlawfully or illegally imprisoned combatants; dismiss Anatoliy Matios, a military prosecutor; arrest and imprison people who contributed to Putin's aggression against Ukraine: in particular, Medvedchuk, Akhmetov, Boyko, Novinskyi, Yefremov, etc. Veterans from the Internal Corps of the Donbas Battalion are actively visiting court sessions concerning volunteer soldiers throughout Ukraine.

Human rights violations
The OHCHR reported that in August–September 2014 eight or ten members of the Donbas and Azov battalions sexually assaulted a man with a mental disability. After the different forms of violence (including cruel treatment and rape), the victim's health significantly deteriorated and he was taken to psychiatric clinic. The issue brought the attention of the Ukrainian Parliamentary Association "Forbidden to Forbid".

In 2016, according to the OHCHR, five fighters of the battalion were taken to court and accused of different criminal activities committed against civilian population: banditry, abduction, armed robbery, extortion, hooliganism  and illegal possession of weapons. However, after a political pressure put on the judges by the former commander of the Donbas battalion and three other parliamentarians, they were released.

A UN monitoring mission in Ukraine reported that during the Battle of Ilovaisk in 2014, the Donbas battalion took part in ill-treatment and torture of male population of the city, aged 30 to 66. From 18 to 28 August 2014, the majority of victims were locked in school No. 14 by members of Donbas battalion. The conditions of the incarceration may amount to ill-treatment, some victims were subjected to beatings, regarding thirteen of them the Office of the United Nations High Commissioner for Human Rights has documented cases of torture. All detained ones who were interviewed by the UN officers told they were beaten with intention to extract confessions that they were affiliated with rebel forces. After the withdrawal of Ukrainian forces from Ilovaisk, a grave with three bodies was exhumed in the backyard of Ilovaisk school No. 14 where the Donbas battalion had been stationed. The UN monitoring mission identified the victims as local civilians. According to the forensic reports, two of them had signs of firearm wounds on their bodies, and third had likely died as a result of shelling.

References

External links

Donbas Battalion Commander: Now, separatists will take as much as we allow them to take (video)

History of Donetsk Oblast
Volunteer National Guard units of Ukraine
Military units and formations established in 2014
Donbas
2014 establishments in Ukraine
Ukrainian nationalist organizations
Military units and formations of the 2022 Russian invasion of Ukraine